Nocardiopsis yanglingensis  is a thermophilic bacterium from the genus of Nocardiopsis which has been isolated from compost of Agaricus bisporus mushrooms.

References 

Actinomycetales
Bacteria described in 2011
Thermophiles